The 2013 AFC U-22 Championship (also known as the 2013 AFC U-22 Asian Cup) was the first edition of the AFC U-22 Championship. The hosting rights for the tournament was awarded to Oman. It was set to take place between 23 June and 7 July 2013 but was postponed to be held between 11 and 26 January 2014 due to the 2013 EAFF East Asian Cup.

Host selection
The AFC Competitions Committee awarded the hosting rights of the 2013 finals to Oman on 18 July 2012. Oman and Thailand were the only nations that came forward wanting to host.

Qualification

The draw for the group stage of qualifying took place in Kuala Lumpur, Malaysia on 14 February 2012. 41 national teams are taking part in qualifying. All group matches were set to be held from 23 June to 3 July 2012 but were later changed to June 2–10, 2012 due to Nepal's request.

Qualified teams

Venues

Squads

Only players born on or after 1 January 1991 were eligible to compete in the 2013 AFC U-22 Asian Cup.

Group stage
The draw for the tournament was conducted on 24 August 2013 in Muscat.

If two or more teams are equal on points on completion of the group matches, the following criteria were applied to determine the rankings.
 Greater number of points obtained in the group matches between the teams concerned;
 Goal difference resulting from the group matches between the teams concerned;
 Greater number of goals scored in the group matches between the teams concerned;
 Goal difference in all the group matches;
 Greater number of goals scored in all the group matches;
 Kicks from the penalty mark if only two teams are involved and they are both on the field of play;
 Fewer score calculated according to the number of yellow and red cards received in the group matches;
 Drawing of lots.

All times are local (UTC+4).

Group A

Group B

Group C

Group D

Knockout stage
In the knockout stage, extra time and penalty shoot-out are used to decide the winner if necessary.

Quarter-finals

Semi-finals

Third place match

Final

Winners

Awards

Goalscorers
5 goals

  Kaveh Rezaei

4 goals

  Marwan Hussein
  Hamza Al-Dardour

3 goals

  Shoya Nakajima
  Abdulfattah Assiri

2 goals

  Peter Skapetis
  Mustafa Nadhim
  Jo Kwang
  Baek Sung-Dong
  Yun Il-Lok
  Hatem Al-Hamhami
  Nasouh Nakdali
  Abdullah Khalid Al Ammar
  Mohammed Majrashi

1 goal

  Ryan Kitto
  Luo Senwen
  Yang Chaosheng
  Behnam Barzay
  Mohannad Abdul-Raheem
  Dhurgham Ismail
  Amjad Kalaf
  Takuma Asano
  Riki Harakawa
  Shinya Yajima
  Ibrahim Daldoum
  Odai Khadr
  Bilal Qwaider
  Ahmed Samir
  Mahmoud Za'tara
  Pak Kwang-Ryong
  Hwang Ui-Jo
  Kim Kyung-Jung
  Lim Chang-Woo
  Moon Chang-Jin
  Faisal Edhms Alenezi
  Maung Maung Soe
  Sami Al Hasani
  Raed Saleh
  Zakaria Sami Al Sudani
  Motaz Ali Hassan Hawsawi
  Mardik Mardikian
  Hamid Mido
  Yousif Saeed
  Salim Khalfan Saif
  Jamshid Iskanderov
  Egor Krimets
  Igor Sergeev
  Sadam Hussein

1 own goal
  Corey Brown (playing against Japan)
  Lim Chang-Woo (playing against Jordan)

Tournament team rankings

References

External links
AFC U-22 Championship, the-AFC.com

 
2013
U-22 Championship
2013–14 in Omani football
2013
2013 in youth association football
AFC U-22 Championship